Idris may refer to:

People 
 Idris (name), a list of people and fictional characters with the given name or surname

 Idris (prophet), Islamic prophet in the Qur'an, traditionally identified with Enoch, an ancestor of Noah in the Bible
 Idris Gawr or Idris the Giant (c. 560–632), Welsh king
 Idris I of Kanem, 14th century King of Chad
 Idris of Libya (1889–1983), King of Libya
 Idris I of Morocco (745–791), Emir of Morocco
 Idris II of Morocco (791–828), Emir of Morocco and founder of the Idrisid dynasty in Morocco, son of the above
 Edrissa Sanneh, Italian television personality known as Idris

Technology
Idris (programming language), a functional programming language with dependent types
Idris (operating system), a multi-tasking, Unix-like, multi-user, real-time operating system

Other uses
 Idris (genus), a genus of parasitic wasps
 Idris, a brand of ginger beer produced by Britvic
 Idris the Dragon, the singing dragon in the 1970s UK children's program Ivor the Engine

See also
 Cadair Idris, a mountain in Gwynedd, Wales, meaning "Chair of Idris [the Giant]"
 Driss
 Iblis (disambiguation)
 Idrisi (disambiguation)
 Idrisi (surname)
 Idriss